Hatchet Lake Airport  is located near Hatchet Lake, Saskatchewan, Canada.

See also 
List of airports in Saskatchewan
Hatchet Lake Water Aerodrome

References 

Registered aerodromes in Saskatchewan